Wendy McClure (born 1971) is an American writer and editor.

She is the author of the memoir I'm Not The New Me as well as The Amazing Mackerel Pudding Plan, a humorous look at 1974 Weight Watchers diet recipes.  Her third book The Wilder Life: My Adventures in the Lost World of ‘Little House on the Prairie’, chronicling her interest in the life and novels of Laura Ingalls Wilder and her travels to their settings, was published in 2011.

McClure has been published in a number of anthologies including Love is a Four-Letter Word and Sleepaway: Writings on Summer Camp and was a regular contributor to The New York Times Magazine's "True Life Tales."  She is the pop culture columnist for Bust magazine and a senior editor at Albert Whitman & Company.

References 

Living people
American columnists
21st-century American memoirists
21st-century American women writers
1971 births
American women memoirists
American women columnists